Lonesome Crow is the debut studio album by the German hard rock band Scorpions. It was recorded soon after Scorpions became a fully professional band under the production of Conny Plank, apparently in only six or seven days, and released 9 February 1972 in West Germany as the soundtrack to the German anti-drug movie Das Kalte Paradies, and May 1973 in the United States. The album's style is darkly melodic, typical for early Scorpions but unlike their later work.

Background
It is the band's only album with lead guitarist Michael Schenker – just 16 at the time of the recording – as a full-time member. He soon left to join UFO and was replaced by Ulrich Roth. Schenker would, however, rejoin briefly during the recording and touring of 1979's Lovedrive.

Michael Schenker in later years has spoken bitterly about not getting his proper writing credit, with a blanket "all songs by Scorpions" when in his mind many of the songs were written by himself and Klaus alone. In particular Michael cites "In Search of the Peace of Mind" remaining, unjustly, in the Scorpions set list for years when it's in reality, his song. Apart from these occasional performances of "In Search of the Peace of Mind" up to 1978 and between 1996 and 2006, Scorpions have played no song from Lonesome Crow since the tour in support of their third album In Trance.

The songs "Action" and "I'm Goin' Mad" are re-recordings of the songs for their unreleased 1970 single on CCA label that were later released on the compilation Psychedelic Gems 2, making them the earliest released Scorpions recordings.

The album had several different sleeves and was re-titled Action for its initial release in Scandinavia, The Scorpions for one 1976 release, and The Original Scorpions, with a different running order, for a Japanese release in 1981 and its first-ever CD issue in 1986. The 1982 German reissue cover art was created by the artist Rodney Matthews.

Track listing

The Original Scorpions 1981 Japanese reissue

Personnel
Credits for Lonesome Crow adapted from Allmusic.

Scorpions
Klaus Meine – vocals
Rudolf Schenker – rhythm guitar
Michael Schenker – lead guitar
Wolfgang Dziony – drums
Lothar Heimberg – bass guitar

Production
Conny Plank – producer
Willem Makkee – mastering

References

1972 debut albums
Scorpions (band) albums
Albums produced by Conny Plank
Albums with cover art by Rodney Matthews
Brain Records albums